The 1978 Mauritanian coup d'état was a bloodless military coup in Mauritania which took place on 10 July 1978. The coup, led by the Army Chief of Staff, Colonel Mustafa Ould Salek, who commanded a group of junior officers, overthrew President Moktar Ould Daddah, who ruled the country since independence from France in 1960. The main motive for the coup was Daddah's ill-fated participation in the Western Sahara War (from 1975 onwards) and the resulting ruin of the economy of Mauritania. Following the coup, Salek had assumed the presidency of a newly-formed military junta, the 20-member Military Committee for National Recovery (CMRN).

Reports from the capital Nouakchott said no shooting had been heard in the city, and no casualties had been announced.

After a period of imprisonment, Ould Daddah was allowed to go into exile in France in August 1979, and was allowed to return to Mauritania on 17 July 2001.

References 

Military coups in Mauritania
1970s coups d'état and coup attempts
History of Mauritania
Coup
Conflicts in 1978
July 1978 events in Africa